Lambda Mensae, Latinized from λ Mensae, is an orange-hued star in the southern constellation of Mensa. It has an apparent visual magnitude of 6.53, which places it at or near the limit on stars visible to the naked eye. According to the Bortle scale, it requires a dark night from rural skies for this star to be viewed. Though it has the designation Lambda, it is actually the twenty-fourth-brightest star in the constellation and not the eleventh-brightest.

This is an evolved K-type giant star with a stellar classification of K0 III. It is a red clump star, which means it is generating energy through helium fusion at its core. At an estimated distance of the star, this yields a physical size of about 10 times the radius of the Sun. It is radiating 54 times the Sun's luminosity from its enlarged photosphere at an effective temperature of 4,713 K.

References

K-type giants
Mensa (constellation)
J05474813-7242080
039810
027369
2062
CD-72 289